Bunny Te Kokiri Miha Waahi Walters (31 May 1953 – 14 December 2016) was a New Zealand singer who had a number of New Zealand hits during the 1970s. He is best known for the hits "Brandy" and "Take the Money and Run".

Background
Of Ngāi Te Rangi descent, Walters was born and raised in Katikati, a town on the North Island of New Zealand.

Career
In 1969, he competed against Tui Fox at Joe Brown's at the Rotorua Soundshell during the Search for Stars event held there. Fox was singing similar material to Walters. Fox won the final with Walters coming in second. His first single, titled "Just Out of Reach", was released in 1969. He then released "It's Been Too Long" and "Can't Keep You Out of My Heart". During one of the talent quests, held at the Opera House in Palmerston North, he was beaten by singer Richard Turei, whose daughter Metiria Turei would later serve as co-leader of the Green Party in New Zealand.

Walters made his first television appearance on Happen-Inn, a New Zealand television show.

After performing at Expo 70 in Osaka, Japan, he received contracts to return to Japan. He gained considerable exposure. The New Zealand Herald reported that he may have also appeared on the Rolf Harris show in London.

In 1971, he replaced Vaughan Lawrence as the resident singer on Happen-Inn.

In 1972, he recorded "Brandy" (which reached No. 4 on the pop charts). It was reported in the edition of 4 May of The New Zealand Herald that due to the big success Walters had with "Brandy" that the song was to be produced in sheet music form. That same year he had a hit with Take The Money And Run" (which reached #2).

In 1973 he had a hit with "Home Isn't Home Anymore" (which reached #18). Also that year he had a gold disc entry with the Bernie Allen arranged "Helena", a Tat Meager composition also recorded that year by Leapy Lee.

1974
In 1974, Walters had a hit with a song originally recorded by Ben Thomas, written by Gary Sulsh, Stuart Leathwood, and Tony Macaulay. His version of "The Nearest Thing To Heaven", produced by Alan Galbraith reached No. 10 that year.

In June he had toured with the Supremes. Another singer from New Zealand, Erana Clark was announced earlier to be on the same tour with Walters. That year he won two awards at the RATA awards. One was for best male vocalist and the other for best recording artist.
Damage to career
In October 1974 he was convicted of possessing a very small amount of marijuana and fined convicted and fined $100 for possession.<ref>Auckland Star, 24 October 1974 – Entertainer had cannabis in car</ref> This had a catastrophic effect on his career. Prior to the conviction, he was always in demand. He was getting work, being hired to perform in pubs, clubs and for certain organisations. Then as a result of falling foul of influential people he was virtually blacklisted from TV and radio. He disappeared from the spotlight almost immediately.New Zealand CDS's –  Walters ,Bunny: Very Best of Bunny Walters 

Mid 70s onwards
In 1978, he recorded a promotional record for the New Zealand Labour Party. The single was titled "To Be Free with Labour" and was the B side of a song titled "To Be Free", written by Robinson-Bretnall.

During the 1980s he was also singing jingles and getting a lot of work in that area. According to an article in AudioCulture by Steven Shaw, The New Zealand Herald  reported in August 1986 that 80% of the advertising jingles heard in New Zealand, featuring male and female voices were by Walters and singer Annie Crummer.Audio Culture, 20 June 2014 – Bunny Walters Profile – Steve Shaw Among these projects was a verse from a version of the New Zealand national anthem that was recorded for World Expo 88, which also aired during TVNZ's daily opening transmission during the late 1980s and early 1990s.

In June 1991, he was appearing on stage in a production of Porgy and Bess.

In 2013, Walters was the profile in episode 9 of The Untold Stories of New Zealand Music History.

Film and television
Drama
Walters appeared in the 1978 film Skin Deep.

The song "Never Say Die" from single the "Never Say Die" / "Gotta Get Outta Here" WEA Records Limited Z10002 was composed and performed by Billy Kristian. It is featured during the closing credits of the 1988 film Never Say Die which starred Temuera Morrison and Lisa Eilbacher. He appeared in an episode of the New Zealand prime-time soap opera, Shortland Street.

Ministry
Walters became a Christian in or around 1995/1997. In a 1999 interview, he told The Sunday Star-Times that his conversion came about as a result of a pastor inviting him to church. Because he didn't have much else going on, he was looking forward to attending. He was living in Queensland, Australia from around 2004, moving around before settling on one of the Islands in Queensland. While living in Queensland, the main amount of singing he did was in church. In his quest to evangelise, he was in Canada at one stage for a month. While there he preached to an Inuit community.

Illness and death
Walters died in Waikato Hospital, Hamilton, on 14 December 2016 after a short illness.'Chur bro': Iconic Māori singer Bunny Walters dies aged 63, Yahoo! News. Retrieved 23 January 2017.

Funeral service
He had been lying in state at Tokoroa's Papa o te Aroha Marae. The funeral service was at Elim Christian Church, with a private cremation to follow.

Tribute concert
It was announced in Stuff'' that a tribute concert for Walters was to be held at the Tokoroa Cosmopolitan Club on 4 February 2017. Artists scheduled to appear were Tom Sharplin, Dennis Marsh, Ray Solomon, Larry Morris, Dennis August and Craven Noble.

Releases

Film and television appearances

References

External links
 The Beat Goes On: Shane Hales Honours Bunny Walters
 Te Karere TVNZ: Iconic Bunny Walters gone but not forgotten

1953 births
2016 deaths
20th-century New Zealand male singers
People from Katikati
Ngāi Te Rangi people
New Zealand male film actors
New Zealand male television actors
New Zealand Māori male singers